Abrázame muy fuerte (Embrace Me Tightly) is a Mexican telenovela that aired in 2000-2001, under the production of Salvador Mejía Alejandre.

It stars Victoria Ruffo, Aracely Arámbula, Fernando Colunga, César Évora and Nailea Norvind.

Plot 
Cristina Álvarez is a sweet young woman, loved by everyone at "El Platanal", a beautiful property whose owner is Severiano Alvarez, her father, who is a man of the field and of strong character.  Diego Hernandez works there as a foreman. He is a strong and handsome man, and is also in love with Cristina. Cristina returns Diego's feelings and they sleep together. Later on, when Severiano finds out Cristina is in love with Diego and that they made love, he tries to kill her, but spares Cristina when she tells him she is pregnant.

Severiano banishes Cristina and Raquela, her servant, to Villahermosa, the Tabascan capital, to have the baby there. By the management of Federico Rivero, little Maria del Carmen comes back to the hacienda as Raquela's daughter. Soon Federico provokes an accident which leaves Cristina blind, in order to have Cristina's fortune.

Years pass and Cristina, in order to be with her daughter, is forced to marry Federico, (Federico loves Cristina) an ambitious and cruel man. From then on, she acts as Maria del Carmen's "godmother".

Meanwhile, Federico is happy about the arrival of his nephew Carlos Manuel to the hacienda. He is a young, handsome, and daring man who has recently completed his studies of medicine overseas.

Carlos Manuel falls in love with Déborah Falcón, without knowing that she is the lover of his uncle. When Federico finds out about this relationship, he opposes it and separates Doña Déborah from his nephew. Meanwhile, from the moment she meets Carlos Manuel, María del Carmen falls in love with him—the two end up together, provoking hate in Déborah, who, along with Federico, tries to separate the young couple. They achieve the separation of the two lovers, but they aren't able to destroy the love that Maria del Carmen and Carlos Manuel feel for each other.

Carlos Manuel finally has his teacher, friend, and specialist in ophthalmology review Cristina's case of blindness to see if he can operate on her. Dr. Angel Luis Robles secretly falls in love with Cristina and has a great interest in helping Cristina recover her sight again. The two form a very special friendship and love despite Cristina's marriage to Frederico. Until his untimely demise, Angel Luis does everything he can to keep Cristina safe, but, when Frederico finds out that Cristina and Dr.Robles are in love, Federico kills Dr.Robles and once again Cristina loses the love of her life. Federico, with the hopes of having Maria del Carmen in his possession at whatever cost, tries to abuse her, but Cristina does not allow it.

In the end, Federico, after being forced to flee Villahermosa, returns after some time to find Cristina. He pulls a gun on her and just as he tries to kill her, Raquela guns him down. Carlos Manuel and Maria del Carmen get married and finally have the peace that they need.

Cast

Main 

 Victoria Ruffo as Cristina Álvarez Rivas de Rivero
 Aracely Arámbula as María del Carmen Hernández Álvarez de Rivero/ María del Carmen Campuzano
 Fernando Colunga as Carlos Manuel Rivero 
 César Évora as Federico Rivero
 Nailea Norvind as Déborah Falcón
 Osvaldo Ríos as Diego Hernández

Secondary 

 Arnaldo André as Dr. Ángel Luis Robles
 Helena Rojo as Damiana/Juliana Guillèn
 Alicia Rodríguez as Consuelo Rivas de Álvarez 
 Emilia Guiu as Flora Bravo
 Joaquín Cordero as Don Severiano Álvarez
 Rosita Quintana as Eduviges de la Cruz y Fereira
 Lilia Aragón as Efigenia de la Cruz y Ferreira
 René Muñoz as Regino
 Pablo Montero as José María Montes
 Rossana San Juan as Raquela Campuzano
 Tina Romero as Jacinta Carrillo 
 Aurora Clavel as Vicenta
 Miguel Córcega as Padre Ignacio
 Mario Casillas as Marcelino
 Ana Hally as Macrina
 Luis Fernando Madriz as Domingo
 Eduardo Noriega (Mexican *
actor)as Francisco "Pancho" Montes
 Dacia González as Candelaria Campusano
 Toño Infante as Eulogio Rojas
 Ignacio Guadalupe as Benito
 Alberto Chávez as Artemio 
 Manuel Raviela as Silverio 
 Alicia Montoya as Gumersinda de Montes 
 Esther Rinaldi as Nieves Muñoz 
 Veronika Con K. as Casilda
 Dacia Arcaraz as Gema
 Jorge De Silva as Abel "Abelito" Ramos
 Emely Faride as Paquita Silva
 Fabián Lavalle as Dr. Fabián Anaya 
 Paco Ibáñez as Juancho
 Abril Campillo as Estelita 
 Rosita Pelayo as La Güera 
 Pedro Romo as Apolinar
 José Antonio Ferral as Fayo Ruiz
 Eduardo Rodríguez as Máximo “Max” Ruiz
 Fidel Pérez Michel

Recurring 
 Ernesto Alonso as Padre Bosco
 Raúl Buenfil as Dandy

Guest starts 
 René Casados as Francisco José Bravo / Fernando Joaquín Bravo
 Toño Mauri as Padre Moisés
 Sergio Reynoso as Comandante Hernán Muñoz
 Manuel Capetillo as Miguel Salvador Zamudio 
 Lalo "El Mimo" as Casimiro
 Carmen Salinas as Celia Ramos
Humberto Elizondo as Bernal Orozco 
Eduardo Santamarina as himself

Awards and nominations

Remake 

In 2015, Angelli Nesma Medina produced Que te perdone Dios for Televisa. Zuria Vega, Mark Tacher and Rebecca Jones were cast as main protagonists. Sergio Goyri, Sabine Moussier, Altaír Jarabo and Laisha Wilkins star as main antagonists.

References

External links 
 

2000 telenovelas
Mexican telenovelas
Spanish-language telenovelas
Televisa telenovelas
2000 Mexican television series debuts
2001 Mexican television series endings